The spotty or paketi, Notolabrus celidotus, is a species of wrasse endemic to the waters around New Zealand, including Stewart Island and the surrounding areas. This species can reach  in standard length. Like other wrasses, spotties begin life as females. Once they reach a length of 13–19 cm at the age of 3–4 years, some of the largest fish may turn into males. Male spotties stake out territories in which they maintain a harem of roughly 20 females that they aggressively defend from other males. When a male dies, the dominant female in the harem will change sex over a few days and take over control of both the harem and territory. This social structure keeps the sex ratio strongly biased towards females. Spawning usually occurs from late July to the end of October.

References

Spotty (fish)
Endemic marine fish of New Zealand
Fish described in 1801
Labridae